The women's 400 metre individual medley event at the 1980 Summer Olympics was held on 26 July at the Swimming Pool at the Olimpiysky Sports Complex.

The eventual gold medal winner, Petra Schneider, later admitted that her performance was aided by the use of steroids as part of the East German state-run doping programme.

Records
Prior to this competition, the existing world and Olympic records were as follows.

The following records were established during the competition:

Results

Heats

Final

References

M
1980 in women's swimming
Women's events at the 1980 Summer Olympics